CBRH may refer to:

 CBRH (AM), a radio rebroadcaster (1170 AM) licensed to New Hazelton, British Columbia, Canada
 Corner Brook Regional High